Eric MacKay (5 August 1899 – 23 July 1966) was a Scottish former international rugby union player who played for Glasgow Academicals. He was a Wing.

Rugby Union career

Amateur career

MacKay played for Glasgow Academicals.

Provincial career

MacKay was capped by Glasgow District. He was part of the team that won the 1921-22 Inter-City against  Edinburgh District.

MacKay played in an era where both Glasgow District and Edinburgh District were noted for having clever players in their back lines; and Glasgow backs were noted as 'a high a standard as Glasgow has attained at almost any stage in the [Inter-City] series'.

International career

MacKay was capped 2 times for Scotland. His debut came in the Scotland v Wales match of 7 February 1920 at Inverleith.

References

1899 births
1966 deaths
Scottish rugby union players
Scotland international rugby union players
Rugby union players from Glasgow
Glasgow District (rugby union) players
Glasgow Academicals rugby union players
Rugby union wings